CRCA may refer to:

 Cataraqui Region Conservation Authority, Ontario, Canada
 Center for Research in Computing and the Arts
 Century Road Club Association
 Christian Reformed Churches of Australia
 University of Puerto Rico at Carolina (formerly known as Colegio Regional de Carolina)
 Cooperative Research Centre Association
 Copyright Remedy Clarification Act